Justin Bradley is a Canadian former actor.

Early life 
He started his career at the age of six, modelling on various department store advertisements. Bradley also appeared in commercials for McDonald's, Danone and Canadian Tire as a child.

Career 
Bradley voiced Arthur Read in 2001 during the sixth season of the children's animated series, Arthur, following the departure of Michael Yarmush. He also voiced Tommy in the Cinelume dub of the Italian animated TV series Tommy and Oscar, Manny Escobar in Fred's Head, and supplying the voice of Charley Bones (a.k.a. Zapman) in the children's animation, Mona the Vampire. He also had a recurring role in the short-lived CW drama The Beautiful Life.

Bradley appeared on camera in such films and programs as Are You Afraid of the Dark?, Dead at 17, Lassie, Who Gets the House?, Kart Racer, Waking the Dead, Mental Block, Galidor: Defenders of the Outer Dimension, Eternal, One Eyed King, Redeemable in Merchandise, and Warm Bodies.

He also was the voice of Eddie in the HBO children's cartoon television series The Little Lulu Show, Jesse McCoy in the second season of The Kids from Room 402, Raffi in the animated series My Life Me and the boy in the animated film Eye of the Wolf as well as several additional characters in Delilah and Julius, A Miss Mallard Mystery, For Better or For Worse, The Country Mouse and the City Mouse Adventures, Simon in the Land of Chalk Drawings, Sagwa, the Chinese Siamese Cat, Rotten Ralph and Caillou.

He also co-starred in the children's television series Naturally, Sadie as Hal, Sadie's brother.

In 2016, Bradley ended his acting career.

Filmography

Film

Television

References

External links

Living people
21st-century Canadian male actors
Canadian male child actors
Canadian male television actors
Canadian male voice actors
Year of birth missing (living people)